Walter Gotsmann (8 January 1891 – 18 July 1961) was a German painter, art teacher, and conservationist.

Life 

Born the son of a teacher, Wilhelm Gotsmann, in Granzow, Mirow, Walter Gotsmann attended the Mirow teacher’s training college from 1905 to 1910, where he received training as a primary school teacher. In 1910 he began teaching in Neucanow. He was appointed lecturer for art history at the Neustrelitz Adult Education Center during the Second World War.

Walter Gotsmann was appointed honorary district commissioner for nature conservation in 1947.

In honor of the achievements of Walter Gotsmann, the city of Neubrandenburg named a street Walter-Gotsmann-Weg. The city of Mirow also has a street named Walter-Gotsmann-Straße, in the Granzow district where Gotsmann was born. There is a Walter Gotsmann memorial stone on the Hellberge mountain near Wendfeld. There is a Walter Gotsmann nature trail in Serrahn.

The children of Walter Gotsmann have handed over his entire artistic and written legacy to the city of Neustrelitz, which has been kept and looked after since 2016 in the Karbe Wagner Archive and museum of the city’s cultural association, Kulturquartier Mecklenburg-Strelitz.

Works 

Illustrated Books
 Picturesque Strelitzer Land. Hinstorff, o. O. 1996,

External links 
 
 
 

20th-century German painters
20th-century German male artists
German landscape painters
People from Mirow
1891 births
1961 deaths